Amy Witting (26 January 1918 – 18 September 2001) was the pen name of an Australian novelist and poet born Joan Austral Fraser. She was widely acknowledged as one of Australia's "finest fiction writers, whose work was full of the atmosphere and colour or times past".

Life
Amy Witting was born in the Sydney suburb of Annandale, and was brought up as a Catholic. She has "melancholy memories of a repressive family life" and remembered the nuns at her school, St Brendan's College, as being "obsessed with the torments of hell". She suffered from tuberculosis as a child.

She went to Fort Street Girls' High School. She studied languages at the University of Sydney where she met, among others, James McAuley, Harold Stewart and Dorothy Auchterlonie. Subsequently, she gained a Diploma of Education at Teachers College and became a school teacher. Her tuberculosis recurred in her early adulthood, resulting in her spending time in a sanitorium which "gave her, for a time, the peace and solitude she always craved".

On 28 July 1934, when Witting was 16, one of her poems, written under the pseudonym De Guesclin, was published in the Sydney Morning Herald. Witting always wrote under a pseudonym.  Her name, Amy Witting, is from a promise she made to herself to "never give up on consciousness', not be unwitting, but to always remain 'witting'".

Witting married Les Levick, a fellow high school teacher, in 1948, and they had one son. Greg. She continued to write until her death, dying of cancer a few weeks after the publication of After Cynthia, her last novel, in 2001.

Career
For most of Witting's working life, teaching English and French, and making a living took priority, and writing was done only in her spare time. Already established Australian writer Thea Astley, who taught with Witting at Cheltenham Girls High School, was impressed by one of her stories, Goodbye, Ady, Goodbye, Joe, and encouraged her to submit it for publication. It was published in The New Yorker in April 1965. Indeed, the poet Kenneth Slessor told Thea Astley to "tell that women I'll publish any word she writes".

In 1974, using the pseudonym Chris Willoughby, Witting wrote a lampoon for Tabloid Story as the result of her anger at "the sexism of the Frank Moorhouse/Michael Wilding tabloid Story tales of sex with an unconscious drugged girl at a party". Her story outraged parents, politicians and teachers; the Minister for Education accused her of corrupting children and stated in Parliament that "Amy Witting is a scribbler on lavatory walls". However, this did not harm her career, and three years later she was mistress of modern languages at North Sydney Girls' High School.

However, Witting's success came late in life when, in retirement, she could spend more time on her writing.  Her first novel, The Visit was published by well-known Australian editor Beatrice Davis. However she rejected I for Isobel on the grounds that "No mother has ever behaved so badly" and McPhee Gribble also rejected it saying that "It's difficult to see what market you had in mind for it". However, it was published by Penguin Books and became an instant best seller. It was with the publication of this book that her talent was finally recognised.

Critic Peter Craven suggests that while Witting's "poetry is the work of a writer who has mastery of any meaning she wishes to convey, [her] fiction took some time to reach fruition, partly because the publishing climate which would be receptive to Witting's brand of realism had to wait the advent of such writers as Helen Garner. Craven writes that "Witting was a great master of realism, a naturalist who could render a nuance in a line that might take a lesser writer a page".

Witting's last three works – Isobel on the Way to the Corner Shop, Faces and Voices, and After Cynthia – were written under difficulty: her sight and hearing were failing, and she was stricken with cancer.

Awards and nominations
1990: Miles Franklin Award. Shortlisted for I for Isobel
1993: Patrick White Award
2000: The Age Book of the Year Award Fiction Prize.
2000: Miles Franklin Award. Shortlisted for Isobel on the Way to the Corner Shop
2002: Posthumously awarded the Member of the Order of Australia (AM) for, "service to Australian literature as a novelist, poet and short story writer, and as a mentor to younger writers".

Bibliography
Novels
 The Visit (1977) 
 I for Isobel (1990) 
 A Change in the Lighting (1994) 
 Maria's War (1998) 
 Isobel on the Way to the Corner Shop (1999) 
 After Cynthia (2001) 

Short story collections
 Marriages (1990)
 Faces and Voices (2000)

Poetry
 Travel Diary (1985) 
 Beauty is the Straw (1991) 
 Collected Poems (1998)

Notes

References
 Amy Witting website by Yvonne Miels
 An introduction to the life and work of Amy Witting: Australian realist fiction writer and poet, Flinders University, (Retrieved 3 August 2007)
 Amy Witting at Australian Poetry Library

1918 births
2001 deaths
Australian women short story writers
People from New South Wales
Members of the Order of Australia
Patrick White Award winners
Australian women novelists
Australian women poets
20th-century Australian poets
20th-century Australian novelists
20th-century Australian women writers
20th-century Australian short story writers